Hinduism is the second largest religion in New Zealand. It is also one of the fastest-growing religions in New Zealand. According to the 2018 census, Hindus form 2.65% of the population of New Zealand. There are about 123,534 Hindus in New Zealand.

Hindus from all over India continue to immigrate today, with the largest Indian ethnic subgroup being Gujaratis. A later wave of immigrants also includes Hindu immigrants who were of Indian descent from nations that were historically under European colonial rule, such as Fiji. Today there are Hindu temples in all major New Zealand cities.

History

Early settlement 

In 1836 the missionary William Colenso saw Māori women near Whangarei using a broken bronze bell to boil potatoes. The inscription is in very old Tamil script. This discovery has led to speculation that Tamil-speaking Hindus may have visited New Zealand hundreds of years ago.

However, the first noted settlement of Hindus in New Zealand dates back to the arrival of sepoys (Indian soldiers) in the 19th century, with the first communities from the Punjab and Gujarat arriving in the 1890s. Until the 1980s almost all Hindu migrants came from Gujarat. Later they arrived from all over India and from elsewhere, including Sri Lanka, Malaysia and South Africa.

Easing of immigration policies and increased immigration: 1987-2001 
In the 1991 Census, surging migration as a result of the Immigration Act 1987 made the number of Hindus surpass 17,000. India's Economic Liberalisation occurred in the same year, increasing the standard of living and allowing more immigrants to come in the future. The 1996 New Zealand Census showed the eased immigration laws resulted in the number of Hindus growing from 18,000 in 1991 to surpassing 25,000 for the first time. This was largely due to the continued success of the Immigration Act 1987.

Fast growth and slowdown: 2001-2012 
In the 2001 Census, the population of Hindus was at almost 40 000, meaning that the number of Hindus tripled in the 10 years since the 1991 census. The 2006 census showed the number of Hindus to be 64,557, an increase of nearly 62% from the previous census in 2001. The growth of the number of Hindus in New Zealand then slowed in the years between the 2006 Census and the 2013 Census because of a mixture of events. The heightened violence against Indian Australians(2007-2010) and the 2011 Christchurch earthquake were the main reasons why growth of Hindus declined. The latter was also the main reason why the Census year was moved from 2011 to 2013. The slowdown in long term migration was partially offset by soaring numbers of Indian Students and Skilled Migrants, whose numbers increased rapidly during the Great Recession partly due to costs being cheaper and a better economic outlook. The recently conducted 2013 Census showed the Hindu population made up slightly over 2% of the population, with 90,018 adherents. This increased Hinduism's share of the total New Zealand population by 0.5% despite immigration slowing as a result of the events mentioned earlier.

Demographics

Hindus in percentage by years

Religion data by years

Classification and ethnicity
According to the 2018 census:
121,644 identified as Hindu (not further defined)
645 Hare Krishnas
327 Yoga
36 Arya Samaj
882 Hindu (not elsewhere classified).

Ethnicity

Majority of the Hindus in New Zealand are Asians, followed by Europeans and Pacific Islanders. There are 3,567 European and 1,857 Pacific peoples following Hinduism. Hinduism also has a small following among Māori. There are 858 Māori following Hinduism

Hindu organisations
The first Hindu organisation - the Hindu Council of New Zealand (HCNZ) was formed in the mid-1990s and is affiliated to the Vishwa Hindu Parishad, a global Hindu organisation. HCNZ has hosted annual New Zealand Hindu conferences since 2007. It has also established the Hindu Heritage Centre, Hindu Social Service Foundation, Hindu Elders Foundation and Hindu Youth New Zealand, and runs youth and family camps. In 2010 HCNZ launched Hindu Organisations, Temples and Associations (HOTA), a representative body for Hindu groups in New Zealand.

Other Hindu organisations include Ramakrishna Mission, Chinmaya Mission, Sathya Sai Organisation, Art of Living Foundation, Hindu Swayamsevak Sangh, Sewa International and  Ekal Vidyalaya Foundation.

Contemporary society

According to a survey done by the Victoria University Wellington in 2019,it was found that New Zealanders believe that Hindus are more trustworthy than atheists, Protestants, Muslims, Catholics and Evangelicals. About 28.3 percent of New Zealanders have complete or much trust in Hindus, while 19.9 percent have little or no trust.

Jews and Hindus hold the highest education level in New Zealand.

Relation with Māori
There are similarities between Hindu and Māori people customs and languages. There are at least 185 Sanskrit and other Indian language words similar to the Māori language. Some Hindu communities also have similar buildings to marae, where people hold meetings and sleep over. Māori also bless new buildings before they open, usually before sunrise, as Hindus do.

Temples
The following is a list of Hindu temples in major New Zealand cities. Cities are ordered by the number of Hindu Temples. The name of the Mandir is in bold and the location is in italics.

Auckland
 Shri Ram Mandir is located at 11 Brick Street, Henderson, Auckland. Ref www.shrirammandir.org.nz
 Thiru Subramaniyar Aalayam is located in 69, Tidal Road, Mangere, Auckland. It is a temple with South Indian style granite deities.
 Bhartiya Mandir is the oldest and the largest Hindu Temple in New Zealand 
 Thirumurugan Temple in Otahuhu.
 Sri Ganesh Temple located in Papakura.
 Radha-Krishna Temple in Eden Terrace
 Ram Krishna Temple in Papatoetoe
 Swaminarayan Temple in Auckland, situated in Papatoetoe and run by The International Swaminarayan Satsang Organisation
 BAPS Shri Swaminarayan Mandir, Avondale, Auckland.

Wellington
 Kurinchi Kumaran Temple, located in Wellington in Newlands. It was the first South Indian style Hindu temple to be established in New Zealand, and it features ancient temple architecture. It is located in 3 Batchelor Street Newlands Wellington.
 The Wellington Indian Association run a North Indian style Temple.
 Sri Venkateswara Swamy Temple of Wellington is located in Wainuiomata. Sanatana Dharma Paripalana Seva Trust of New Zealand, registered charity in New Zealand established the temple in 2018 with community support and operational from Nov 2019 at 25, Waiu Street, Wainuiomata, Wellington.
 BAPS Shri Swaminarayan Mandir, 83A Eastern Hutt Road, Taita, Lower Hutt

Tauranga
 Sanatan Dharam Mandir, built by the members of the Tauranga Hindu community. The trust bought roughly 2150 square meters of land in the suburb of Tauriko for around $400,000. Despite being inaugurated in 2012, work on the actual Hindu Temple did not commence until early 2015. Stage One of the temple was completed by mid-late 2015. The temple is located at 108 Whiore Ave, Tauriko, Tauranga.

Christchurch
 Christchurch's and the South Island's only Hindu temple is the BAPS Shri Swaminarayan Mandir Christchurch, located in 19 Frank Street in the suburb of Papanui. The mandir was inaugurated on 2011, after a "Mahapuja". The temple was inaugurated after 12 months of renovations, which the 2011 Christchurch earthquake temporarily halted.

Rotorua
 The BAPS Sri Swaminarayan Temple, Rotorua's first Hindu Temple, opened in 2012 making it the fourth "BAPS" temple in New Zealand. It the only Hindu Temple in the central north island.

Hamilton
 The Sri Balaji Temple was opened in March 2015, six years after the founding of the Sri Balaji Temple Charitable Trust
 BAPS Shri Swaminarayan Mandir, 10 Tawn Place, Pukete, Hamilton 3200

Other locations
 The International Society for Krishna Consciousness also has a presence in New Zealand, running temples in Auckland, Hamilton, Wellington and Christchurch. The Auckland temple is located out of the city, and is built in the Vedic style with a tower over the main shrine.

Attack on Hindu Community

A West Auckland Hindu temple was the target of an arson attack over Labour weekend. The incident occurred at Shri Ram Mandir on Brick St in Auckland's Henderson on October 21, 2022 about 11.30pm. Temple spokesperson Pravin Kumar said, "It could have been disastrous because, on the premises, we also have a priest's quarters where the family of the priest were present - it's attached to the same building, and people could have died."

Notable Hindus

Sport
Jeetan Patel, former spin bowler for the New Zealand cricket team, the Black Caps
Roy Krishna, Fijian football player playing for Wellington Phoenix FC as a striker in the A-league
Dipak Narshibhai Patel, cricket player Tests and one-day internationals for New Zealand
Jeet Raval, current batsman for the Black Caps Test match team
Roneel Hira, New Zealand cricketer
Tarun Nethula, New Zealand cricketer
Rachin Ravindra, current New Zealand cricketer

Entertainment
Aaradhna Patel, Half Samoan and half Indian R&B artist
Shailesh Prajapati, New Zealand actor, known for his role as Ernie in Power Rangers MegaForce

Media
Rohit Kumar Happy, editor of Bharat-Darshan, Hindi literary magazine
Vanita Prasad, chief reporter, Western Leader
Rebecca Singh, openly gay news anchor on the New Zealand television station TV3

Politics
Mahesh Bindra, Hindu Member of Parliament
Priyanca Radhakrishnan, first Hindu woman Member of Parliament since 2017 
Rajen Prasad, former Race Relations Commissioner and Families Commissioner, first Hindu Member of Parliament serving from 2008-2014
Anand Satyanand, former Governor-General of New Zealand, appointed on 23 August 2006

See also
 Religion in New Zealand
 Hinduism in Vietnam
 Hinduism by country
 Little India
 Hinduism in Australia
 Hinduism in South Africa
 Indian New Zealanders or Indo-Kiwis 
 Non-resident Indian and Person of Indian Origin
 Tamil bell

References

External links
Hindu scholar finds similarities with Maori culture
Directory of Hindu Temples in New Zealand